Gugak FM is a South Korean radio broadcasting station specializing in Korean traditional music (gugak) and culture. Its coverage extends through Seoul, Gyeonggi-do, and Jeollado, and Gyeongsang, and Gangwon Province.

External links 
 Gugak FM website

Radio stations in South Korea